William Shakespeare (16 June 1849 – 1 November 1931) was an English tenor, teacher and composer.

Life

John William Thomas Shakespeare was born in Croydon England on 16 June 1849. In 1866 he won a King's Scholarship to study at the Royal Academy of Music, London, with William Sterndale Bennett.  Awarded the Mendelssohn Scholarship in 1871, he traveled to Leipzig to study with composer, pianist, conductor, and pedagogue Carl Reinecke, but soon left Leipzig for Milan, to study under the guidance of the singing teacher Francesco Lamperti.  He appeared in England once again as a tenor in 1875 where he sang at the Monday Popular Concerts at the Crystal Palace and the 1877 Leeds Festival. He was appointed as a Professor of Singing at the Royal Academy of Music in 1878 and Conductor of the Concerts in 1880, resigning the latter post in 1886.  From 1902 to 1905 Shakespeare was the conductor of the Strolling Players' Amateur Orchestral Society (which had been founded in 1882). He died in London in 1931.

Shakespeare composed few works, but his Piano Concerto was heard at the 1879 Brighton Festival, where The Musical Times outlined his singing career and judged that

"if the revision and production of his Concerto signify a return to creative art, all who know his ability will be glad. We have not so many promising young composers amongst us that we can afford to spare even one. Looking back upon the entire Concerto, I must characterise it as remarkable for grace and refinement, but as somewhat wanting in the strength given by symphonic employment of the orchestra and highly contrasted subjects. It serves, however, to revive interest in Mr. Shakespeare as a composer, and to determine towards him in the musical world an expectant attitude."

In addition to singing, teaching and composition, William Shakespeare wrote and published several books.  These include The Art of Singing, a three-part series published from 1898 to 1899, Singing for Schools and Colleges, published in 1907, Plain Words on Singing in 1924, and The Speaker's Art in 1931.  William Shakespeare's style of vocal pedagogy mirrored closely that of his Italian mentor Lamperti, as evidenced by his direct reference to la lotte vocal, a concept taken directly from the nineteenth-century Italianate school of vocal development.

Works

Orchestral

 1871 - Symphony in C minor (Gewandhaus, Leipzig)
 1872 - Overture in D (Crystal Palace, London, 25 January 1873)
 1874 - Hamlet, dramatic overture (Crystal Palace, London)

Solo instrumentalist and orchestra

 1879 - Piano Concerto in C (Brighton Festival, 12 February 1879)

Further reading
Slominsky, N, Kuhn, L. (2001).  Shakespeare, William. In Baker's Biographical Dictionary of Musicians, p 8292.  New York: Schirmer Books.
Sell, K. (2005) The Disciples of vocal Pedagogy: Towards an Holistic Approach, pp 33, 113-114.  Williston, VT: Ashgate Publishing Co.
Stark, J. A. (1999) Bel Canto: A History of Vocal Pedagogy, p 43-44. Toronto: University of Toronto Press.

References

External links 

World-cat link to Plain Words on Singing
World-cat link to The Speaker's Art
 The Art of Singing, in full text
 

1849 births
1931 deaths
English tenors
Alumni of the Royal Academy of Music